Weissbach or Weißbach may refer to:

People
 Herbert Weißbach (1901–1995), German actor
 Karl Weißbach (1841–1905), German architect and university lecturer
 Teresa Weißbach (born 1981), German actress best known for her role as Miriam in the 1999 film Sonnenallee
 Zeev Nehari (born Willi Weissbach; 1915–1978), mathematician who worked on Complex Analysis, Univalent Functions Theory and Differential and Integral Equations

Places
 Weißbach, Baden-Württemberg, a municipality in Baden-Württemberg, Germany
 Weißbach, Thuringia, a municipality in Thuringia, Germany
 Weißbach bei Lofer, a municipality in the state of Salzburg, Austria
 Bílý Potok (Liberec District), German name Weißbach, a village in the Liberec Region of the Czech Republic
 Panchià, German name Weissbach, a comune in Trentino in the northern Italian region Trentino-Alto Adige/Südtirol

Rivers
 Weißbach (Schneizlreuth), a river of Bavaria, Germany, tributary of the Saalach, in the areas of the municipalities Inzell and Schneizlreuth
 Weißbach (Lattengebirge), a river of Bavaria, Germany, tributary of the Saalach, its source at the Dreisesselberg, Lattengebirge
 Weißbach (Roda), a river of Thuringia, Germany, left tributary of the Roda
 Weissbach (Schwarzbach), a river of Hesse, Germany, tributary of the Schwarzbach
 Tuffbach (Inn), locally also known as Weissbach, a short river in Insbruck, Austria

Other
 Weissbach Formation, a geologic formation in Austria

Surnames of German origin